The 1932 Wisconsin gubernatorial election was held on November 8, 1932. Incumbent Republican Governor Philip La Follette was defeated in the Republican primary, and in the midst of the Great Depression and nationwide voter dissatisfaction with the Republican Party, Democratic nominee Albert G. Schmedeman defeated Republican nominee Walter J. Kohler Sr. and Socialist nominee Frank Metcalfe with 52.48% of the vote. Schmedeman became the first Democrat to win a gubernatorial election in Wisconsin since George Wilbur Peck in 1892. 2 years later, in 1934, La Follette would run for Governor again and defeated Schmedeman, this time running with the Progressive Party.

As of 2022, this marks the last occasion that Waupaca County has voted Democratic in a gubernatorial election.

Primary elections
Primary elections were held on September 20, 1932.

Democratic primary

Candidates
Leo P. Fox, Democratic nominee for Wisconsin's 6th congressional district in 1920 and for Lieutenant Governor in 1928
William B. Rubin, attorney
Albert G. Schmedeman, mayor of Madison and Democratic nominee for Governor in 1928

Results

Republican primary

Candidates
Walter J. Kohler, Sr., former Governor
Philip La Follette, incumbent Governor

Results

Socialist primary

Candidates
Frank Metcalfe, nominee for Governor in 1930

Results

Prohibition primary

Candidates
Adolph R. Bucknam, Prohibition nominee for U.S. Senate in 1922 and for Governor in 1924 and 1928
William C. Dean, Prohibition nominee for Governor in 1918

Results

General election

Candidates
Major party candidates
Albert G. Schmedeman, Democratic
Walter J. Kohler Sr., Republican

Other candidates
Fred B. Blair, Communist, nominee for Governor in 1930
William C. Dean, Prohibition
Frank Metcalfe, Socialist
Joseph Ehrhardt, Socialist Labor, nominee for Governor in 1928

Results

References

Bibliography
 
 

1932
Wisconsin
Gubernatorial
November 1932 events in the United States